In organic chemistry, a cross-coupling reaction is a reaction where two different fragments are joined. Cross-couplings are a subset of the more general coupling reactions. Often cross-coupling reactions require metal catalysts. One important reaction type is this:

  (R, R' = organic fragments, usually aryle; M = main group center such as Li or MgX; X = halide)

These reactions are used to form carbon–carbon bonds but also carbon-heteroatom bonds.  Cross-coupling reaction are a subset of coupling reactions.

Richard F. Heck, Ei-ichi Negishi, and Akira Suzuki were awarded the 2010 Nobel Prize in Chemistry for developing palladium-catalyzed coupling reactions.

Mechanism
Many mechanisms exist reflecting the myriad types of cross-couplings, including those that do not require metal catalysts.  Often, however, cross-coupling refers to a metal-catalyzed reaction of a nucleophilic partner with an electrophilic partner.

In such cases, the mechanism generally involves reductive elimination of R-R' from LnMR(R') (L = spectator ligand). This intermediate LnMR(R') is formed in a two step process from a low valence precursor LnM. The oxidative addition of an organic halide (RX) to LnM gives LnMR(X). Subsequently, the second partner undergoes transmetallation with a source of R'−. The final step is reductive elimination of the two coupling fragments to regenerate the catalyst and give the organic product. Unsaturated substrates, such as C(sp)−X and C(sp2)−X bonds, couple more easily, in part because they add readily to the catalyst.

Catalysts

Catalysts are often based on palladium, which is frequently selected due to high functional group tolerance. Organopalladium compounds are generally stable towards water and air. Palladium catalysts can be problematic for the pharmaceutical industry, which faces extensive regulation regarding heavy metals.  Many pharmaceutical chemists attempt to use coupling reactions early in production to minimize metal traces in the product.  Heterogeneous catalysts based on Pd are also well developed.

Copper-based catalysts are also common, especially for coupling involving heteroatom-C bonds.

Iron-, cobalt-, and nickel-based catalysts have been investigated.

Leaving groups
The leaving group X in the organic partner is usually a halide, although triflate, tosylate and other pseudohalide have been used. Chloride is an ideal group due to the low cost of organochlorine compounds.  Frequently, however, C–Cl bonds are too inert, and bromide or iodide leaving groups are required for acceptable rates.  The main group metal in the organometallic partner usually is an electropositive element such as tin, zinc, silicon, or boron.

Carbon–carbon cross-coupling
Many cross-couplings entail forming carbon–carbon bonds.

Carbon–heteroatom coupling
Many cross-couplings entail forming carbon–heteroatom bonds (heteroatom = S, N, O).  A popular method is the Buchwald–Hartwig reaction:

Miscellaneous reactions
Palladium-catalyzes the cross-coupling of aryl halides with fluorinated arene. The process is unusual in that it involves C–H functionalisation at an electron deficient arene.

Applications
Cross-coupling reactions are important for the production of pharmaceuticals, examples being  montelukast, eletriptan, naproxen, varenicline, and resveratrol. with Suzuki coupling being most widely used. Some polymers and monomers are also prepared in this way.

Reviews

References

 
Organometallic chemistry
Carbon-carbon bond forming reactions
Catalysis